Self-proclaimed describes a legal title that is recognized by the declaring person but not necessarily by any recognized legal authority. It can be the status of a noble title or the status of a nation. The term is used informally for anyone declaring themselves to any informal title.

Examples
Micronations such as Sealand are small, self-proclaimed entities that claim to be independent sovereign states but which are not acknowledged by any recognized sovereign state.
A self-proclaimed monarch such as Jean-Bédel Bokassa.
 Self-styled order, a chivalric order with unrecognised claim of historical legacy

Usage

See also
Pretender
Self-declared states

References

Civil law (common law)